Naka'ela is a possibly extinct Austronesian language spoken in Seram, Indonesia. Usage decreased after speakers moved out of the mountains.

References

Central Maluku languages
Languages of Indonesia
Seram Island
Endangered Austronesian languages